Jeff Hertzberg is an American cookbook author and a physician. With co-author Zoë François, he has created three cookbooks on baking homemade bread. The books teach a no-knead method of baking which uses dough that is stored in the refrigerator for up to two weeks, making it convenient for home cooks to bake fresh bread daily.

First Book: Artisan Bread in Five Minutes a Day
Thomas Dunne Books editor Ruth Cavin bought the U.S. rights to Artisan Bread in Five Minutes a Day after hearing Hertzberg call in to National Public Radio's The Splendid Table on April 4, 2000. Thomas Dunne Books, a subsidiary of St. Martin's Press/Macmillan Publishers, has published all of their books. Artisan Bread in Five Minutes a Day was an instant success upon its publication in 2007, earning coverage on the Today Show, in the New York Times and the Chicago Tribune, as well as other publications.

Subsequent Books
Hertzberg and François have written two follow-up books: Healthy Bread in Five Minutes a Day (2009) and Artisan Pizza and Flatbreads in Five Minutes a Day (2011). The authors provide online support for readers through their blog.

Works
 Artisan Bread in Five Minutes a Day, St. Martin’s Press, 2007
 Healthy Bread in Five Minutes a Day, St. Martin’s Press, 2009
 Artisan Pizza and Flatbread in Five Minutes a Day, St. Martin’s Press, 2011
 The New Artisan Bread in Five Minutes a Day, St. Martin's Press, 2013
 Gluten-Free Artisan Bread in Five Minutes a Day, St. Martin’s Press, 2014
The New Healthy Bread in Five Minutes a Day, St. Martin's Press 2016
Holiday and Celebration Bread in Five Minutes a Day, St. Martin’s Press, 2018

References

External links
 

Living people
American cookbook writers
American male non-fiction writers
Year of birth missing (living people)